The Mayan Theater (110 Broadway, Denver, Colorado) is a movie house that opened in 1930 and was part of the Fox Theater Corporation and Fox Intermountain Theaters.  Its life as a Fox Theatre is denoted on top of its neon marquee. As with many theaters across the U.S., it ran an A and B slate of films throughout the day. During the Great Depression, the theater held grocery nights where customers had the opportunity to win groceries.

The theater closed around 1984. In 1986, the theatre was converted into a three-plex by closing off the balcony and dividing it into two additional small theatres. This conversion included a restoration of the interior walls, decor and lobby. Landmark Theaters has operated the location as an "art house" since 1986.

The Mayan is one of the country's three remaining theatres designed in the Art Deco Mayan Revival style.  The city of Denver has declared it to be a historic landmark.

References

External links
http://cinematreasures.org/theaters/229
http://catchcarri.com/mayan-theatre-history-denver/

Cinemas and movie theaters in Colorado
Theatres in Denver